Stéphanie Foretz (born 3 May 1981) is a retired tennis player from France.

Foretz won nine singles and 16 doubles titles on the ITF Women's Circuit. On 24 February 2003, she reached her career-high singles ranking of world No. 62. On 19 May 2008, she peaked at No. 42 in the doubles rankings.

Foretz was an accomplished junior player, having reached the final of the girls' tournament at the 1999 French Open. She also was selected to play for the Boston Lobsters in the 2009 World TeamTennis pro league.

In 2010, Foretz married Benoît Gacon and began competing under the name Stéphanie Foretz Gacon. In 2014, however, she reverted to her maiden name as Stéphanie Foretz.

WTA career finals

Doubles: 2 (0–2)

ITF finals

Singles (9–20)

Doubles (16–15)

Grand Slam performance timelines

Singles

Doubles

External links
 
 
 

1981 births
Living people
People from Issy-les-Moulineaux
French female tennis players
Sportspeople from Hauts-de-Seine